The Yaygir, Yuraygir, or Yaegl, are an Australian Aboriginal tribe who traditionally live and lived in and around Yamba and Maclean, New South Wales.

Language
Yaygir was one of the two Gumbaynggiric languages, closely related to Gumbaynggir, both of which split from the same proto-language, though in developing their differences, their lexical cognate count was reduced to half, 46%. It is considered by Terry Crowley to be the most 'aberrant' of New South Wales languages for its phonology and acceptance of initial vowels, as opposed to the standard formation of words, which normatively begin with consonants, the latter feature something it shares with Nganjaywana. The last speaker was Sandy Cameron of Yamba (d.1973). It had a voiceless trill unique to Australian languages.

Country
Yaygir country stretched from Coffs Harbour northwards to Evans Head, and inland to Cowper on the Clarence River. They were and are a coastal people. Some reports state that the tribe or horde local to Coffs Harbour itself was called 'Womboyneralah', meaning 'where the kangaroos camped.'

People
The Yaygir were bounded by the Bandjalang to the north, and the Gumbaynggirr to the south.

Alternative names
 Jeigir
 Jungai
 Yaegl
 Yagir
 Yegera
 Yegera
 Yegir
 Yiegera
 Youngai

Source:

Some words
 abl (wallaby)
 dalga (sing)
 dulbay (language)
 duwo (boomerang)
 ngaluunggirr (clever-man)

Source:

Notes

Citations

Sources

Aboriginal peoples of New South Wales